Sensations of 1945 is a 1944 American musical-comedy film directed by Andrew Stone and starring Eleanor Powell. Released by United Artists, the film was an attempt to recapture the ensemble style of films such as Broadway Melody of 1936 by showcasing a number of top musical and comedy acts of the day, in a film linked together by a loose storyline. Sensations of 1945 stars dancer Powell and Dennis O'Keefe as two rival publicists who fall in love, but the film's main purpose is to showcase a variety of different acts, ranging from tightrope walking to comedy to Powell's athletic tap dancing. The rollicking supporting cast features W.C. Fields in his final role the year before his death, C. Aubrey Smith, Eugene Pallette, dancer David Lichine, Lyle Talbot, Sophie Tucker, jazz pianist Dorothy Donegan, Cab Calloway, Woody Herman, jazz pianist/composer Gene Rodgers, and Les Paul.

The picture is notable for several reasons. It was Powell's first and only film after leaving Metro-Goldwyn-Mayer, where she  became a star nearly a decade earlier; it was also her final starring role in a film, after which she would only make a cameo in MGM's Duchess of Idaho in 1950 and some unused footage of her would appear in a 1946 MGM compilation, The Great Morgan. Powell's dance inside a giant pinball machine (as part of the song, "Spin Little Pinball") has been cited by critics variously as both a highlight and as the nadir of her film career.

The film was nominated for an Academy Award for Best Music Scoring.

Plot

Cast

Eleanor Powell as Ginny Walker
Dennis O'Keefe as Junior Crane
C. Aubrey Smith as Dan Lindsey
Eugene Pallette as Gus Crane
Mimi Forsythe as Julia Westcott
Lyle Talbot as Randall
Hubert Castle as The Great Gustafson
W. C. Fields as himself
Sophie Tucker as herself
Dorothy Donegan as herself
The Christianis as Themselves
Pallenberg Bears as Themselves
Cab Calloway and His Band as Themselves
Woody Herman and His Band as Themselves
David Lichine as himself
Richard Hageman as Pendergast
Marie Blake as Miss Grear
Stanley Andrews as Mr. Collins
"Uncle Willie" as himself
Gene Rodgers as himself
Mel Hall as himself
Johnson Brothers as Themselves
Flying Copelands as Themselves
Starless Night as himself
Les Paul Trio as Themselves
And Louise Currie, Constance Purdy, Wendell Niles, Anthony Warde

External links
 
 

1944 films
American black-and-white films
United Artists films
Films directed by Andrew L. Stone
1944 musical comedy films
American musical comedy films
1940s English-language films
1940s American films